The stiX is a project by record producer Mark Hill of Artful Dodger. Each track features a guesting British vocalist, most notably Corinne Bailey Rae.

Discography

Albums
Gathering Dust EP (Absolute) (2004) all tracks featured on later album
Better Luck Next Time (Absolute) (2005)

Singles
"Young & Foolish" (Absolute) (2005)

References

External links
 Official website
 Amazon UK listing and reviews

English musical groups